John Keith Riddell (born December 10, 1931) is a former politician in Ontario, Canada. He was a Liberal member of the Legislative Assembly of Ontario from 1973 to 1990, and served as a cabinet minister in the government of David Peterson.

Background
Riddell was educated at the Ontario Agricultural College in Guelph, Ontario, and worked as a high-school teacher and a livestock sales owner and operator-auctioneer. He is a prominent member of the Agricultural Institute of Canada.

Politics
He was first elected to the Ontario legislature in a by-election on March 16, 1973, defeating Progressive Conservative candidate Don Southcott by 2,968 votes in the riding of Huron. He was re-elected by somewhat narrower margins in the elections of 1975, 1977, and 1981, in the redistributed riding of Huron—Middlesex.

Riddell was on the traditionalist right-wing of the Liberal Party, and represented agricultural interests in the legislature. He brought forward a private "right-to-farm" bill in the 1980s, attempting to protect farmers against urban incursion and related matters.

The Liberal party formed a minority government following the 1985 provincial election, after having been out of power for 42 years.  Riddell, re-elected without difficulty, was appointed Minister of Agriculture and Food on June 26, 1985.  Easily re-elected again in the 1987 provincial election, Riddell remained Agriculture Minister until August 2, 1989.  He did not run for re-election in 1990.

Cabinet positions

Later life
Riddell was president of the Ontario Agricultural Hall of Fame Association in 2003–04, and has served as president of the Ontario Institute of Agrologists.  He is also a prominent member of Heartland Community Credit Union Ltd, which was merged to form United Communities Credit Union, and later Libro Credit Union.

On June 11, 2017, Riddell was inducted into the Ontario Agriculture Hall of Fame.

References

Notes

Citations

External links

1931 births
Living people
Members of the Executive Council of Ontario
Ontario Liberal Party MPPs
Politicians from London, Ontario